Brandon Dillon (born April 27, 1972) is an American politician. He is the former Chair of the Michigan Democratic Party.

Early life and education
Dillon is a graduate of Catholic Central High School (1990), Grand Rapids Community College (1993), and Aquinas College (1996).

Career
Dillon was elected Chair of the Michigan Democratic Party in July 2015 after partnering with former Oakland County, Michigan Deputy Clerk Lavora Barnes to run as a team. In 2010, he was a Kent County Commissioner. From 2011 to 2015, Dillon was a Democratic member of the Michigan House of Representatives. As a legislator, Dillon strongly opposed Michigan's Right-to-work law.

References

External links
 
 
Legislative website

1972 births
Grand Rapids Community College alumni
Living people
Democratic Party members of the Michigan House of Representatives
Politicians from Grand Rapids, Michigan
Michigan Democratic Party chairs
21st-century American politicians